A Very Grammy Christmas was a Christmas-themed television special that aired on CBS on December 5, 2014. Guests included Ariana Grande, Maroon 5, Tim McGraw and Pharrell Williams. It received 4.73 million viewers and a 0.8/3 rating/share.

See also

 57th Annual Grammy Awards
 List of United States Christmas television specials

References

External links
 
 A Very GRAMMY Christmas Special at CBS.com

2014 television specials
CBS television specials
Christmas television specials